Francis "Frank" Jeeves (15 February 1927 – 11 June 2010) was an Australian rules footballer who played with North Melbourne in the Victorian Football League (VFL).

Jeeves, who came from Wonthaggi originally, arrived at North Melbourne via the Fitzroy seconds.

He played his best football in 1949, as a centre half-forward, polling eight Brownlow Medal votes to finish as North Melbourne's third best vote getter. This was despite missing the last six rounds of the season due to an injury, which also kept him out of the finals series.

Jeeves missed another 14 weeks of football in 1950 with an injured ankle but this time recovered before the finals and lined up at centre half-forward in the VFL Grand Final. He had an uninterrupted season in 1951, playing all 18 games.

During the 1954 season, having not played a game the previous year, Jeeves was granted a clearance to Moorabbin.

References

1927 births
Australian rules footballers from Victoria (Australia)
North Melbourne Football Club players
Moorabbin Football Club players
2010 deaths